Cambiaso is an Italian surname. Notable people with the surname include:

 Adolfo Cambiaso (born 1975), Argentine polo player
 Luigi Cambiaso (1895–1975), Italian gymnast
 Luca Cambiaso (1527–1585), also known as Cambiasi, Italian Renaissance painter
 Esteban Cambiasso (born 1980), Argentine football midfielder
 Nicolás Cambiasso (born 1978), Argentine football player, elder brother of Esteban Cambiasso

Italian-language surnames